Trichohippopsis unicolor is a species of beetle in the family Cerambycidae. It was described by Galileo and Martins in 2007.

References

Agapanthiini
Beetles described in 2007